This is a list of notable footballers who have played for Bayer Leverkusen. Generally, this means players that have played a significant amount of first-class matches for the club. Other players who have played an important role for the club can be included, but the reason why they have been included should be added in the 'Notes' column.

For a list of all Bayer Leverkusen players, major or minor, with a Wikipedia article, see Category:Bayer Leverkusen players, and for the current squad see the main Bayer Leverkusen article.

Players are listed according to the date of their first team debut. Appearances and goals are for first-team competitive league matches only; wartime matches are excluded. Substitute appearances included.

Table

World Cup players
The following players have been selected by their country for the FIFA World Cup finals, while playing for Bayer Leverkusen.

  Cha Bum-kun (1986)
  Jorginho (1990)
  Ioan Lupescu (1994)
  Paulo Sérgio (1994)
  Emerson (1998)
  Jan Heintze (1998)
  Christian Wörns (1998)
  Ulf Kirsten (1994, 1998)
  Lúcio (2002)
  Yıldıray Baştürk (2002)
  Frankie Hejduk (2002)
  Carsten Ramelow (2002)
  Oliver Neuville (2002)
  Michael Ballack (2002)
  Hans-Jörg Butt (2002)
  Diego Placente (2002)
  Boris Živković (2002)
  Jurica Vranješ (2002)
  Jens Nowotny (2006)
  Bernd Schneider (2002, 2006)
  Jacek Krzynówek (2006)
  Fredrik Stenman (2006)
  Juan (2006)
  Marko Babić (2006)
  Assimiou Touré (2006)
  Andriy Voronin (2006)
  Stefan Kießling (2010)
  Toni Kroos (2010)
  Hans Sarpei (2010)
  Arturo Vidal (2010)
  Tranquillo Barnetta (2006, 2010)
  Eren Derdiyok (2010)
  Andrés Guardado (2014)
  Emir Spahić (2014)
  Son Heung-min (2014)
  Tin Jedvaj (2018)
  Julian Brandt (2018)
  Piero Hincapié (2022)
  Jeremie Frimpong (2022)
  Sardar Azmoun (2022)
  Exequiel Palacios (2022)

References 

 
Bayer 04 Leverkusen
Association football player non-biographical articles